The 1896 Washington gubernatorial election was held on November 3, 1896.

Populist nominee John Rankin Rogers defeated Republican nominee Charley Sullivan, with 55.55% of the vote.

General election

Candidates
Major party candidates
John Rankin Rogers, Populist, state senator
Potter C. "Charley" Sullivan, Republican

Other candidates
Robert E. Dunlap, Prohibition

Results

References

1896
Washington
Gubernatorial